Louis Gary Clemente (June 13, 1908 – May 13, 1968) was an American lawyer and politician who served two terms as a United States representative from New York from 1949 to 1953.

Biography
Born in New York City, he attended St. Ann's Academy in Manhattan and LaSalle Military Academy in Oakdale. He received a Reserve officer's certificate at Plattsburgh in 1925 and a Reserve commission in 1929.

In 1931 he graduated from Georgetown Law School, and was admitted to the District of Columbia bar. Clemente practiced in Washington, D.C. and in New York.

Military service 
Clemente entered the United States Army as a second lieutenant in 1941 and served until released from active duty as a lieutenant colonel in 1946. He was a member of the New York City Council from 1946 to 1949.

Tenure in Congress 
He was elected as a Democrat to the Eighty-first and Eighty-second Congresses, holding office from January 3, 1949 to January 3, 1953. He was an unsuccessful candidate for reelection in 1952 to the Eighty-third Congress.

Later career and death 
After leaving Congress Clemente was executive vice president of Unexcelled Chemical Corp., Ohio Bronze Corp., Premier Chemical Corp., and Modene Paint Corp.

He died in Jamaica, New York; interment was in St. John's Cemetery, Flushing.

References
 Retrieved on 2008-03-20

1908 births
1968 deaths
Georgetown University Law Center alumni
Walsh School of Foreign Service alumni
United States Army officers
New York (state) lawyers
New York City Council members
Burials at St. John's Cemetery (Queens)
Democratic Party members of the United States House of Representatives from New York (state)
20th-century American lawyers
20th-century American politicians
St. Ann's Academy (Manhattan) alumni
United States Army personnel of World War II